Ernest Frederick of Baden-Durlach (born 17 October 1560 in Durlach – died 14 April 1604 in Remchingen) ruled the northern part of the Margraviate of Baden-Durlach.  He came to power when he came of age in 1584.  He founded the first Gymnasium Illustrie in the margraviate.  His conversion from the Lutheranism to Calvinism and his occupation of Upper Baden caused serious conflicts – even with the Emperor – the consequences of which damaged Lower Baden and ultimately also led to losses of territory.

Life 
Ernest Frederick was the eldest son of the Margrave Charles II of Baden-Durlach and Anna of Veldenz.  From 1577 onwards, he received his education at the court of his guardian, the Lutheran Duke Louis III of Württemberg.

The regency 1577–1584 
After his father's death, a regency council was formed, consisting of  his mother Anna, Elector Palatine Louis VI, Elector Palatine (until 1583), Duke Philip Louis of Neuburg and Duke Louis "the Pious" of Württemberg.  The council ruled Margraviate of Baden-Durlach on his behalf when he inherited it as a minor.

The division of territories 
Ernest Frederick and Charles II's second oldest son, James, both wanted to own dominions.   Charles II's last will and testament forbade that, but it had not been signed and sealed, so the remaining guardians decided to give them their way and divide the country.  Ernest Frederick received Lower Baden, including the large towns of Durlach and Pforzheim.

His younger brothers James and George Frederick also received parts of the country, so that the land was further divided beyond the existing division into Baden-Durlach, Baden-Baden.  The Margraviate of Baden-Hachberg fell back to Ernest Frederick in 1590 after James's death.  His youngest brother George Frederick was able to reunite the whole Margraviate of Baden-Durlach after's Ernest Frederick's death.

Marriage 
Margrave Ernest Frederick married on 21 December 1585 Anna of East Frisia (26 June 1562 – 21 April 1621), the daughter of Count Edzard II of East Frisia and widow of his guardian.  The marriage produced no children.

Ancestors

Footnotes 

1560 births
1604 deaths
House of Zähringen
Margraves of Baden-Durlach
16th-century German people